Piotr Robert Ravn-Haren (born 2 May 1970) is a Danish former professional footballer who played as a right-back. He most notably represented BK Frem, Lyngby Boldklub and F.C. Copenhagen. Haren is of Polish descent.

Career
Haren joined the KB as a 14-year-old in 1984, and made his breakthrough in the first team as a forward in 1989–91.

While at Lyngby Boldklub, where he signed in 1993, manager Benny Lennartsson made him into a right-back. 

He joined Copenhagen in 1998, and made his debut for the club on 26 July 1998, starting in a 2–0 away win over Vejle Boldklub in the Danish Superliga. He fell out with an injury late in the first half, and was substituted by Morten Falch. 

On 14 January 2019, Haren was hired to the staff of Lyngby Boldklub.

Personal life
He is the son of Janusz Andrzej Haren, who represented Widzew Łódź and B.93.

References

External links 
 Piotr Haren at BK FREM
 

1970 births
Living people
Footballers from Łódź
Danish men's footballers
Danish expatriate men's footballers
Danish people of Polish descent
Boldklubben af 1893 players
Kjøbenhavns Boldklub players
Boldklubben Frem players
Lyngby Boldklub players
F.C. Copenhagen players
Apollon Limassol FC players
Aarhus Gymnastikforening players
Danish Superliga players
Expatriate footballers in Cyprus
Association football fullbacks
Hellerup IK managers
Danish expatriate sportspeople in Cyprus